Buckroe Beach Carousel, also known as Philadelphia Toboggan Company Number Fifty and the Hampton Carousel, is a historic carousel operated by the Hampton History Museum located at Hampton, Virginia.  It was built by the Philadelphia Toboggan Company and installed at Buckroe Beach in 1920.  It measures 45 feet in diameter and the platform consists of 18 sections.  It has 42 oil paintings; 30 mirrors; a 1914 Bruder band organ that plays 66 key B.A.B. rolls, 48 hand-carved wooden horses placed three abreast; and two upholstered, hand-carved wooden chariots.  It was disassembled in 1985 when the Buckroe Beach Amusement Park closed.  It was restored between 1988 and 1991 by R&F Designs of Bristol, CT, and was installed that year in its present location in Carousel Park, 602 Settlers Landing Road, across from the Virginia Air and Space Center.

It was listed on the National Register of Historic Places in 1992.

References

External links
Hampton History Museum website

Carousels on the National Register of Historic Places in Virginia
Carousel Number 50
Amusement rides introduced in 1920
Buildings and structures in Hampton, Virginia
National Register of Historic Places in Hampton, Virginia
1920 establishments in Virginia